Kadhal Pisase is a 2012 Indian Tamil-language action film released in 2012. The film is directed and produced by newcomer Aravind, who also plays the lead role, alongside Mithuna. This film is named after a song from Run.

Cast

Soundtrack 

All songs were composed by Brunthan.

Reception 
The Times of India gave this film a 1 out of 5 stars. The reviewer wrote that "Director Aravind (who also plays the lead) is said to have learnt acting from the Toronto Film Institute. From what unfolds on screen, we are forced to think that he needs to repeat his courses there".

References

External links 

Indian action films
Films set in Mumbai
Fictional portrayals of the Maharashtra Police
Films about drugs
Films shot in Mumbai
Films set in Chennai
Films shot in Chennai
Films set in universities and colleges
2010s Tamil-language films
2012 action films